QVC Germany is a branch of QVC, a multinational corporation specialising in televised home shopping, originally founded in 1986 by Joseph Segel in West Chester, Pennsylvania. It expanded into Germany in 1996. QVC broadcasts in four major countries to 141 million consumers. The name is an initialism—standing for "Quality, Value, Convenience".

With a market share of 50%, QVC is one of the 10 largest mail-order companies in Germany. QVC is spread over four locations: Düsseldorf in Hafen, with the administration, purchasing and studio; Hückelhoven with the distribution center, Kassel and Bochum with the QVC call center.

History
The program is received in 37.5 million households in Germany and Austria via cable and satellite. In addition, QVC's product range since 2002, has been available via the Internet across Europe. In Germany, QVC began its program with a daily eight-hour live broadcasts and since 1 October 2003 24 hours live. Only from 14:00 Christmas Eve until 9:00 Christmas Day are repeats aired instead of live broadcasts.  Since March 1, 2010 QVC Germany broadcast in the ratio 16:9. Since March 16, 2012 starting QVC Germany, Channel two "QVC Beauty & Style".

Starting with September 1, 2010 QVC uses the "Q Logo" which is used for few years in the United States and has an additional channel "QVC Plus".

In November 29, 2013, QVC reduced its live programming to 17 hours a day, from 7am to midnight. 35 jobs were affected as a consequence.

Awards
In October 2005, QVC received the "consignor of the year" from Federation of German mail e. V.

References

External links
 QVC Germany
 QVC Germany - Live Stream
 QVC Plus
 QVC Beauty

Shopping networks
Television stations in Germany
Germany
Companies based in Düsseldorf
Television channels and stations established in 1996
1996 establishments in Germany
Mass media in Düsseldorf